This is a list of airlines currently operating in Bhutan.

Scheduled airlines

See also
 List of airlines
 List of defunct airlines of Asia

Aviation in Bhutan
Bhutan
Bhutan
Airlines
Airlines